Defending champions Stéphane Houdet and Shingo Kunieda defeated Gustavo Fernández and Gordon Reid in the final, 6–2, 6–1 to win the men's doubles wheelchair tennis title at the 2015 Australian Open.

Seeds

Draw

External links
 Main Draw

Wheelchair Men's Doubles
2015 Men's Doubles